Jan Dekert (1786 – 1861) was a Polish Catholic priest, auxiliary Auxiliary Bishop of Warsaw from 1859–1861. He was the son of mayor of Warsaw Jan Dekert.

References

 
 

 
 

1786 births
1861 deaths
Polish Roman Catholic titular bishops
19th-century Roman Catholic bishops in Poland